The Stadelhorn (2,286 m) is the highest and most prominent peak in the Reiter Alm on the Austro-German border, lying on the boundary between the states of Bavaria and Salzburg.

The Stadelhorn is a popular, but rather exposed hiking summit.
The view from the top extends from the Untersberg, the Hochkalter and Watzmann over the Leoganger Steinberge and Loferer Steinberge to the Sonntagshorn as well as large parts of the Lower Saalach valley. In addition, on clear days, the Stadelhorn offers a view from the Großer Priel in the east over the Dachstein and the High Tauern - including the Großglockner and Großvenediger - to Germany's highest peak, the Zugspitze, in the west.
At the foot of the Stadelhorn on the Austrian side are the villages of St. Martin b. Lofer, Lofer and the parish of Unken; on the Bavarian side is the Klausbach valley and the Hintersee lake.

The normal route to the top of the Stadelhorn runs along the western arête (Westgrat) beginning at the Mayrberg gap (Mayrbergscharte, 2055 m). From here there are various options:

Direct climbs:
 along the Loferer Steig (path) from the Austrian side.
 along the Schaflsteig (path) from the Bavarian side (Engert Alm).

Ascents via the Roßkar gap (Roßkarscharte) and the upper Wagendrischel cirque (Wagendrischelkar):
 from the Neue Traunsteiner Hut along the Roßgasse or the Steinberggasse.
 From the lake of Hintersee along the Böselsteig (path)

Unlike its eastern neighbour, the Großes Mühlsturzhorn, the Stadelhorn has fewer climbing options, although an ascent does require a head for heights and sure-footedness. Only a sports climbing tour up the southwest face is used more often.

Mountains of the Alps
Berchtesgaden Alps
Mountains of Bavaria
Mountains of Salzburg (state)
Two-thousanders of Austria
Berchtesgadener Land
Two-thousanders of Germany